Explorer++ is a free and open-source navigational file manager for Microsoft Windows. It features multi-tabbed panes, bookmarks menu, and a customizable user interface. It can be configured to run portably or use the registry. It can also be set to replace Windows Explorer as the default file manager.

See also
Comparison of file managers

References

External links

 
 Forget Windows Explorer, Explorer++ Is The Perfect, Powerful Alternative

File managers for Microsoft Windows